General Muzaffar ud din was a Pakistan Army officer and former governor of East Pakistan.

Career
On 26 March 1969 General Yahya Khan declared martial law and made General Muzaffaruddin the Chief Martial Law Administrator of East Pakistan. Muzaffaruddin was then the General Officer Commanding of East Pakistan's 14th Infantry Division. From 25 March 1969 to 23 August 1969 he was also the acting governor of East Pakistan. HE was made chairman of the Agricultural Development Corporation of West Pakistan.General Muzaffar ud din belong to Gujjar family. Son in Law Babai koom Gujjar Khan Bahadur Molvi Fetah ud din Gujjar founder gujjar gazzat.
General Muzaffar Ud Din Son Dr. Mazahar Ud Din Medical Supritendent Ganga Ram Hospital .Daughter Mrs Chaudhry Abdul Majid Director Social Secorty Punjab

References

Living people
Pakistani military personnel
Governors of East Pakistan
Pakistani generals
Year of birth missing (living people)